The Verde Valley is a valley in central Arizona in the United States. The Verde River runs through it. The Verde River is one of Arizona's last free-flowing river systems. It provides crucial habitat for fish and wildlife, fresh water for local agricultural production, recreational opportunities for locals and tourists alike, and brings clean drinking water to over 2 million people in the greater Phoenix area. The valley is overlooked by Mingus Mountain and the Mogollon Rim. The valley is one of three regions of viticulture in Arizona and contains the Verde Valley AVA.

History 
The first notice of this region appears in the report of Antonio de Espejo, who visited in 1583. Little more was recorded until the commencement of prospecting for gold and silver in the 19th century.

Towns 
 Camp Verde
 Clarkdale
 Cornville
 Cottonwood
 Jerome
 Lake Montezuma
 McGuireville
 Rimrock
 Sedona

In popular culture 

Verde Valley was the setting for the 1977 sci-fi thriller movie Kingdom of the Spiders, starring William Shatner. The theme song for the film, "Peaceful Verde Valley," was recorded by country singer Dorsey Burnette.

See also
 Tuzigoot National Monument (pueblo ruin)
 V Bar V Heritage Site (petroglyphs)
 Montezuma Well
 Montezuma Castle National Monument
 Verde Canyon Railroad
 Arizona Central Railroad

References

External links 
 Verde Valley Travel & Vacation Guide
 Common Plants of the Verde Valley & Sedona
 Sedona Verde Valley Tourism Council
 Coordonates of Verde River Greenway
 US government site on the Verde River

Valleys of Arizona
Regions of Arizona
Landforms of Yavapai County, Arizona